Cybalomia lutosalis is a species of moth in the family Crambidae. It is found in Italy (including Sardinia), Croatia, and Turkey.

References

Moths described in 1862
Cybalomiinae
Moths of Asia
Moths of Europe